Albin Pelak (born 9 April 1981) is a Bosnian-Herzegovinian retired football player.

Club career
Albin Pelak is a current FK Olimpik Sarajevo and former FK Željezničar football player. He is most famous in Bosnian and Sarajevo circles for signing with Željezničar after making an explicit promise to Sarajevo supporters that he would never play there.

Prior to signing with Željezničar, Pelak was one of the most popular players for Sarajevo, earning the praise of the press as well supporters for his high work rate and leadership ability. He was a key part of Sarajevo's exceptionally talented youth squad composed of players born in 1981/1982 that was one of the most talented squads in Bosnia-Herzegovina's history. Many players from that generation such as Alen Škoro, Džemal Berberović, Damir Mirvić went on to have relatively successful careers in Europe.

Pelak himself also made several tries, albeit unsuccessful at playing abroad, going to Cerezo Osaka of Japan in 2002 and Dinamo Zagreb of neighboring Croatia in 2003. While he did not stay at either club for very long, it has been reported that he has been paid handsomely for his failed bids abroad; his deal with Cerzo Osaka reportedly netted him €1 million. On 4 April 2009 Pelak ended his contract with FK Željezničar and signed a contract with FK Olimpik Sarajevo, playing in Premier League.

International career
He made his debut for Bosnia and Herzegovina in an August 2002 friendly match against Serbia and Montenegro and has earned a total of 2 caps, scoring no goals. His second and final international was an October 2005 World Cup qualification match against San Marino.

Club statistics

National team statistics

References

External links

1981 births
Living people
Sportspeople from Novi Pazar
Bosniaks of Serbia
Association football midfielders
Bosnia and Herzegovina footballers
Bosnia and Herzegovina under-21 international footballers
Bosnia and Herzegovina international footballers
NK Varaždin players
FK Sarajevo players
Cerezo Osaka players
GNK Dinamo Zagreb players
FK Željezničar Sarajevo players
FC Zvezda Irkutsk players
FK Olimpik players
Premier League of Bosnia and Herzegovina players
J1 League players
Russian First League players
Bosnia and Herzegovina expatriate footballers
Expatriate footballers in Japan
Bosnia and Herzegovina expatriate sportspeople in Japan
Expatriate footballers in Russia
Bosnia and Herzegovina expatriate sportspeople in Russia